Bow Bridge is a small town in the Great Southern of Western Australia. It is located between Denmark and Walpole on the South Coast Highway. It also situated on the Bow River.

Farms were established in the area prior to 1917.

The townsite now consists primarily of the roadhouse that overlooks the bridge. The roadhouse was established prior to 1960 and operates as a fuel station, post office, grocery store and cafe.

References

Great Southern (Western Australia)